The 2019–20 Arkansas State Red Wolves women's basketball team represented Arkansas State University during the 2019–20 NCAA Division I women's basketball season. The Red Wolves, led by first year head coach Matt Daniel, played their home games at First National Bank Arena in Jonesboro, Arkansas as members of the Sun Belt Conference. They finished the season 11–19, 8–10 in Sun Belt play to finish in a seventh place. They lost in the first round of the Sun Belt women's tournament to South Alabama.

Preseason

Sun Belt coaches poll
On October 30, 2019, the Sun Belt released their preseason coaches poll with the Red Wolves predicted to finish in tenth place in the conference.

Sun Belt Preseason All-Conference team

3rd team

Peyton Martin – JR, Forward

Roster

Schedule

|-
!colspan=9 style=| Non-conference regular season

|-
!colspan=9 style=| Sun Belt regular season

|-
!colspan=9 style=| Sun Belt Women's Tournament

See also
2019–20 Arkansas State Red Wolves men's basketball team

References

Arkansas State Red Wolves women's basketball seasons
Arkansas State